is a passenger railway station located in the town of Tōin, Mie Prefecture, Japan, operated by the private railway operator Sangi Railway.

Lines
Tōin Station is served by the Hokusei Line, and is located 9.7 kilometres from the terminus of the line at Nishi-Kuwana Station.

Layout
The station consists of a single island platform, connected to the station building by a level crossing.

Platforms

Adjacent stations

History
The station was opened on March 26, 2005  as a part of a Mie prefectural proposal to increase the convenience of transportation and thus many modern and handicapped-friendly facilities are found at the station.  
June 22, 2005:  Automatic ticket gates installed.  Fare adjustment machine installed.
April 13, 2006:  Train service at the station is temporarily replaced by bus service for over a month due to a nearby train derailment.
March 26, 2008:  Access road to the station is widened and improved.

Passenger statistics
In fiscal 2019, the station was used by an average of 504 passengers daily (boarding passengers only).

Surrounding area
Kuwana City Fire Department Toin Branch (in front of the station)
Toin Town General Government Building 
Toin Town General Cultural Center
Toin Municipal Kanda Elementary School (10 minutes walk to the east)

See also
List of railway stations in Japan

References

External links

Sangi Railway official home page

Railway stations in Japan opened in 2005
Railway stations in Mie Prefecture
Tōin, Mie